The 1949 Wightman Cup was the 21st edition of the annual women's team tennis competition between the United States and Great Britain. It was held at the Merion Cricket Club in Haverford, Pennsylvania, United States.

References

1949
1949 in tennis
1949 in American tennis
1949 in British sport
1949 in women's tennis
1949 in sports in Pennsylvania
August 1949 sports events in the United States